Walker Pond is a body of water in Sturbridge, Massachusetts, situated off Route 49 on the way to Wells State Park.

History
The pond took its name from settler Rachael "Walker" Smith, a local resident who raised twelve Italian children there.  (The house, since demolished, was called the Perez Walker House in memory of Nathaniel Walker's grandson, a prominent townsman.) In 1894, the town of Sturbridge voted to rename the pond Tantousque Lake, from an Indian word meaning "located between two breast-shaped hills."  The traditional Indian name did not, however, stick.

Fishing
According to a 1980 survey, the pond contains largemouth bass, chain pickerel, yellow perch, white perch, bluegill, pumpkinseed, brown bullhead, white suckers, and golden and bridled shiners. It is a popular place for ice fishing.

References

External links
Wells State Park
 

Lakes of Worcester County, Massachusetts
Sturbridge, Massachusetts
Ponds of Massachusetts